The National Hispanic Media Coalition (NHMC) is a nonprofit 501(c)(3) civil rights organization that was founded to eliminate hate, discrimination, and racism towards the Latino community.

NHMC collaborates with other social justice organizations to eliminate online hate and hold online platforms accountable for their content. They advocate for the Lifeline Program, Net Neutrality protections, and also work in closing the digital divide for Latino and other marginalized communities. NHMC works in partnership with other civil rights organizations to safeguard democracy in the United States of America.

Ongoing Advocacy Goals 
NHMC is a media advocacy and civil-rights organization for the advancement of Latinos, advocating for inclusiveness, balanced media portrayals, and universal, affordable, and open access to communications.

Among the issues NHMC works on are:

Responsible and Inclusive Media 
Preserving media ownership limits is critical to protecting media ownerships of color from bring crowded out by rampant media consolidation.

Universal and Affordable Communications 
The Lifeline Program has worked for three decades as the only government program dedicated to bringing phone and internet service within reach for people of color, the poor, seniors, veterans, people with disabilities, and the less educated.

Community Powered Solutions 
In today's digital age, consumers are growing more concerned about the invasions of their privacy by the government and corporations. Government agencies and Internet Service Providers (ISPs) have sweeping access to the personal information of individuals and user activity online.

Partner Coalitions 
It serves as the Secretariat of the National Latino Media Council which encompasses the 10 largest Latino civil rights and advocacy organizations in the country including:

 Hispanic Association of Colleges and Universities (HACU)
 LatinoJustice PRLDEF
 League of United Latin American Citizens (LULAC)
 Latino Theater Company @ The Los Angeles Theatre Center
 Mexican American Legal Defense and Educational Fund (MALDEF)
 Mexican American Opportunity Foundation (MAOF)
 National Association of Latino Arts and Culture (NALAC)
 National Institute for Latino Policy (NiLP)

Created in 1999, NLMC is dedicated to increasing Latino employment in the media industry, at all levels both in front and behind the camera, do away with negative stereotypes, and advocate for media policy that benefits the Latino community. NLMC is also the organization that signed "Memoranda of Understanding" with ABC, CBS, NBC, and Fox therefore increasing the employment ranks of Latinos and other people of color at all four networks.

NHMC Impact Awards Gala
The National Hispanic Media Coalition's annual Impact Awards Gala, held in Beverly Hills, California, has recognized those contributing to the positive portrayal of Latinos in Hollywood. Honorees include: Jaime Camil, Karla Souza, Jorge R. Gutierrez, Demian Bichir, Diego Luna, Edward James Olmos, Aubrey Plaza, Zoe Saldana, Eva Longoria, Robert Rodriguez, Jorge Ramos, Alejandro Gonzalez-Iñárritu, James Cameron, Benjamin Bratt, Danny Trejo, Gina Rodriguez, George Lopez, and Francia Raisa.

References

External links 
 

1986 establishments in California
Organizations based in Pasadena, California
Organizations established in 1986
Hispanic and Latino American organizations
Hispanic and Latino American culture in California